Martina Jentsch (born 22 March 1968 in Leipzig) is a former East German gymnast who competed in the 1988 Summer Olympics.

Career
At the 1985 East German National Championships, Jentsch placed 5th on vault. Jentsch attended the 1985 World Artistic Gymnastics Championships in Montreal, Canada, where she helped the East German team win a bronze medal. In 1986, Jentsch won the bronze medal in the all-around at the 1986 East German National Championships as well as gold medals on vault and floor exercise. At the same competition, she was placed 4th on uneven bars and 5th on balance beam. At the 1987 European Championships, she was placed 7th in the all-around, 8th on balance beam and 6th on floor exercise. Jentsch was a member of the bronze medal-winning team at the 1987 World Artistic Gymnastics Championships in Rotterdam, Netherlands. Individually, she was placed 7th in the all-around final, 8th in the vault final, 7th in the uneven bars final and 7th in the floor exercise final. In 1988, Jentsch and the East German team won the bronze medal in the team competition at the Seoul Summer Olympics though, individually, she did not qualify to any finals.

Eponymous skills
Jentsch has two eponymous skills listed in the Code of Points.

References

1968 births
Living people
German female artistic gymnasts
Olympic gymnasts of East Germany
Gymnasts at the 1988 Summer Olympics
Olympic bronze medalists for East Germany
Olympic medalists in gymnastics
Sportspeople from Leipzig
Recipients of the Patriotic Order of Merit in bronze
Medalists at the 1988 Summer Olympics
Originators of elements in artistic gymnastics